Thyrocopa cinerella is a moth of the family Xyloryctidae. It is endemic to the Hawaiian island of Kauai.

The length of the forewings is 15–19 mm. Adults are on wing from at least April to July.

External links

Thyrocopa
Endemic moths of Hawaii
Moths described in 1907